Andrew J. "Ajax" Jackson (September 28, 1865 – May 15, 1900) was an American baseball third baseman in the late 19th century, who played for predecessor teams to the Negro leagues. He played for several teams from 1887 to 1899, spending the majority of his career with the Cuban Giants. He was the brother of fellow player Oscar Jackson.

References

External links

1865 births
1900 deaths
Cuban Giants players
Baseball infielders